Bradley Adam Perez, nicknamed "Bread", (born January 21, 1997), is an American professional stock car racing driver and pit crew member. He competes part-time in the NASCAR Xfinity Series, driving the No. 53 car for Emerling-Gase Motorsports. He worked as a tire specialist in the NASCAR Craftsman Truck Series for Rackley WAR from 2021 to 2022.

Racing career

Early career

Go-Karts
Perez began racing in 2015, at the age of 18, when he raced go-karts at the AMR Motorplex, outside of the Homestead-Miami Speedway, driving for RYSA Racing.

SCCA
In 2017 he began racing in the SCCA, driving in the Spec Miata category, for his own team, Brad Perez Racing.

In 2019, he went full-time racing in Spec Miata's, driving in the Hoosier Super Tour in SCCA.

From 2019-2021, he would work as a tire specialist for NASCAR teams, JD Motorsports in 2019, Martins Motorsports in 2020, and Rackley WAR in 2021.

In 2020, Perez would return to the Hoosier Super Tour, and would race in the ChampCar 14 Hours of Daytona later that year.

Legend Cars
In 2018, he went over to Legends cars, where he drove at the Citrus County Speedway and the Auburndale Speedway for a few races, driving for Little Gator Motorsports.

From 2020-2022 he would return for select races for Josh Williams Motorsports.

Crew chief
On April 19, 2022, it was announced that Perez will work as a crew chief for Willie Mullins in the 2022 General Tire 200 at Talladega. It was revealed on the entry list for the race.

ARCA Menards Series

2021
On July 30, 2021, NASCAR Xfinity Series driver Josh Williams, announced that Perez would drive for his team in the 2021 Clean Harbors 100 at the Glen, making it Perez's first ever ARCA Menards Series start. Perez would start the race and finish in 24th position despite running towards the top 10 till late in the race.

2022
He would do pre-season testing at Daytona to kick off 2022 with Willie Mullins with plans to compete if he can find sponsorship for the season.

Camping World Truck Series

2022

On March 21, 2022, Perez announced that he would make his NASCAR Camping World Truck Series debut at the Circuit of the Americas for Reaume Brothers Racing where he would start 32nd and finish 20th. On June 6, 2022, Perez announced he would make another appearance with Reaume Brothers Racing at Sonoma Raceway with sponsorship from the band I Set My Friends on Fire.

Xfinity Series

2022
On July 25, 2022, Perez announced that he would attempt to make his NASCAR Xfinity Series debut for MBM Motorsports in the 2022 Pennzoil 150 at Indianapolis, driving the No. 13 car, however he failed to qualify. On August 16, Perez would announce that he would once again attempt to make his Xfinity Series start at Watkins Glen, this time driving the 35 car for Emerling-Gase Motorsports. He was able to make the race after qualifying 27th. He would finish the race in 20th, earning his first career top 20 in his first start.

2023
On January 23, 2023, Perez announced in a video skit that he will return to Emerling-Gase Motorsports for the 2023 season, running four races, and may run more if sponsorship can be found.

Personal life
Perez graduated from the Monsignor Edward Pace High School in 2015, in Miami Gardens, Florida. He attended Broward College graduating from the class of 2017.

Perez is a disc jockey in his free time. He also occasionally is the merch guy at concerts for metalcore band, I Set My Friends On Fire.

Motorsports career results

NASCAR
(key) (Bold – Pole position awarded by qualifying time. Italics – Pole position earned by points standings or practice time. * – Most laps led. ** – All laps led.)

Xfinity Series

Camping World Truck Series

 Season still in progress
 Ineligible for series points

ARCA Menards Series
(key) (Bold – Pole position awarded by qualifying time. Italics – Pole position earned by points standings or practice time. * – Most laps led.)

References

External links
 
 

Living people
1997 births
Racing drivers from Florida
Racing drivers from Miami
ARCA Menards Series drivers
NASCAR drivers
Sportspeople from Hollywood, Florida